Liuxiandong station is a Metro station of Shenzhen Metro Line 5. It opened on 22 June 2011. This station is an underground station.

Station layout

Exits

References

External links
 Shenzhen Metro Liuxiandong Station (Chinese)
 Shenzhen Metro Liuxiandong Station (English)

Shenzhen Metro stations
Railway stations in Guangdong
Nanshan District, Shenzhen
Railway stations in China opened in 2011